Bang Pa-in station is a railway station located in Ban Len Subdistrict, Bang Pa-in District, Phra Nakhon Si Ayutthaya. On site is a royal pavilion for the Royal Family and is used on some occasions when a member of the Royal Family visits the Bang Pa-In Royal Palace.

Train services 
 Rapid No. 105/106 Bangkok- Sila At- Bangkok
 Rapid No. 111/112 Bangkok- Den Chai- Bangkok
 Rapid No. 141/142 Bangkok- Ubon Ratchathani- Bangkok
 Rapid No. 145/146 Bangkok- Ubon Ratchathani- Bangkok
 Ordinary No. 201/202 Bangkok- Phitsanulok- Bangkok
 Ordinary No. 207/208 Bangkok- Nakhon Sawan- Bangkok
 Ordinary No. 209/210 Bangkok- Ban Takhli- Bangkok
 Ordinary No. 211/212 Bangkok- Taphan Hin- Bangkok
 Ordinary No. 233/234 Bangkok- Surin- Bangkok
 Commuter No. 301/302 Bangkok- Lop Buri- Bangkok (weekends only)
 Commuter No. 303/304 Bangkok- Lop Buri- Bangkok (weekdays only)
 Commuter No. 305/306 Bangkok- Ayutthaya- Bangkok (weekdays only)
 Commuter No. 313/314 Bangkok- Ban Phachi Junction- Bangkok (weekdays only)
 Commuter No. 315/316 Bangkok- Lop Buri- Bangkok (weekdays only)
 Commuter No. 317/318 Bangkok- Lop Buri- Bangkok (weekdays only)
 Commuter No. 339/340 Bangkok- Kaeng Khoi Junction- Bangkok (weekdays only)
 Commuter No. 341/342 Bangkok- Kaeng Khoi Junction- Bangkok (weekdays only)
 Commuter No. 343/344 Bangkok- Kaeng Khoi Junction- Bangkok (weekends only)

References 
 
 

Railway stations in Thailand